Gabriel Malzaire (born 4 October 1957 in Mon Repos, Saint Lucia) is a Saint Lucian clergyman and Archbishop of Castries. He was ordained in 1985 and was appointed bishop in 2002. While he had previously opposed efforts to repeal laws against homosexuality Roseau, in 2021 he changed course and began to support efforts to repeal laws against homosexuality. On 11 February 2022, he was appointed Archbishop of Castries, to be installed on 24 April.

References

External links

1957 births
Living people
People from Micoud Quarter
Saint Lucian Roman Catholic bishops